The Rochester Knighthawks were a lacrosse team based in Rochester, New York that played in the National Lacrosse League (NLL). The 2007 season was the 13th in franchise history. Rochester started the season 2-2 but then won their last 12 consecutive regular season games. After defeating Toronto and Buffalo in the playoffs, they won the right to host the Championship game against Arizona. However, due to scheduling conflicts at the Blue Cross Arena, the Sting hosted the final game. The Knighthawks extended their winning streak by defeating the Sting 13-11 for their first NLL Championship since 1997. 

The winning streak would continue into the 2008 season, but only by a single game.

Regular season

Conference standings

Game log
Reference:

Playoffs

Game log
Reference:

Player stats
Reference:

Runners (Top 10)

Note: GP = Games played; G = Goals; A = Assists; Pts = Points; LB = Loose balls; PIM = Penalty minutes

Goaltenders
Note: GP = Games played; MIN = Minutes; W = Wins; L = Losses; GA = Goals against; Sv% = Save percentage; GAA = Goals against average

Awards

Roster
Reference:

See also
2007 NLL season

References

Rochester
National Lacrosse League Champion's Cup-winning seasons
Rochester Knighthawks